The 1993 Kentucky Derby was the 119th running of the Kentucky Derby. The race took place on May 1, 1993, and there were 136,817 people in attendance.

Payout
The 119th Kentucky Derby Payout Schedule

 $2 Exacta: (6-5)  Paid   $190.60

Full results

References

1993
Kentucky Derby
Derby
Kentucky
Kentucky Derby